Princess Caroline Augusta of Bavaria (8 February 1792 – 9 February 1873) was Empress of Austria by marriage to Francis I of Austria. She was the penultimate child and third daughter of King Maximilian I Joseph of Bavaria and Princess Augusta Wilhelmine of Hesse-Darmstadt. She firstly married to Crown Prince William of Württemberg in 1808, but they divorced 1814.

Early life
Caroline Augusta was born on 8 February 1792 in Mannheim, Electoral Palatinate. She was the fourth child and third daughter of Maximilian I Joseph of Bavaria and his wife, Princess Augusta Wilhelmine of Hesse-Darmstadt. At the age of two, Caroline Augusta caught smallpox. Although she survived, her face was left scarred.

First marriage
On 8 June 1808, in Munich, Caroline Augusta married Crown Prince William (1781–1864), becoming Crown Princess of Württemberg. They had no children and were divorced on 31 August 1814.

Her first marriage was arranged to avoid a political marriage arranged by Napoleon. After the marriage ceremony, her spouse said to her: We are victims to politics. She spent her time writing letters to her brother Louis, and learning Italian and English. The couple never bonded with each other and the marriage was finally annulled by Pope Pius VII to enable both of them to make remarriages that were valid in the Catholic Church. At the time of the annulment, it was claimed by them that they had lived separately in the palace and that the marriage had never been consummated.

Empress
After the annulment of her marriage, Caroline Augusta was considered as a bride for both the Emperor Francis II and his younger brother, Ferdinand. Later, Ferdinand III, Grand Duke of Tuscany withdrew his proposal and Caroline Augusta became the Emperor's bride.

On 29 October 1816, Caroline Augusta married Francis II, Emperor of Austria, King of Hungary and Bohemia. She became the fourth wife of the emperor, who was 24 years older than her and had fathered thirteen children by two of his previous wives. The English diplomat Frederick Lamb called the new empress "ugly, clever and amiable," and the emperor her husband had this to say of her: "She can stand a push, the other was nothing but air." The wedding, and indeed their married life, was very simple due to the strict economy favoured by the Emperor. Prior to this marriage, Caroline Augusta had always been known as Charlotte, but now she began using the name Caroline.

This marriage, which lasted until the emperor's death almost 20 years later, was harmonious but remained childless. She became popular in Austria and was active in social work; she founded several hospitals and residences for the poor. After the death of her spouse in 1835, she moved to Salzburg and lived there in quiet dignity until her own death nearly four decades later. The dowager empress died in February 1873, one day after her 81st birthday.

Like her husband Francis II, who was devoted to his family and exhorted his heir in his last testament to "Preserve unity in the family and regard it as one of the highest goods," Caroline Augusta also was close to her relatives, especially her sister and niece who were also married into the imperial family. She was also close to her stepdaughter’s son, Napoleon II. She was good friends with her half-sister, the Archduchess Sophie, who was married in 1824 to Caroline's step-son Archduke Franz Karl of Austria and would become the mother of two emperors, Franz Joseph of Austria-Hungary, and Maximilian of Mexico. She was also close to her half-niece, the Empress Elisabeth, who was Sophie's niece and daughter-in-law.

A pearl brooch formerly owned by Caroline Augusta was auctioned at Sotheby's in 2012.

Ancestry

References

External links 

Austrian empresses
Crown Princesses of Württemberg
Hungarian queens consort
Bohemian queens consort
1792 births
1873 deaths
House of Wittelsbach
People from Mannheim
Princesses of Württemberg
Bavarian princesses
Burials at the Imperial Crypt
Wives of Francis II, Holy Roman Emperor
Daughters of kings